Streptomyces vitaminophilus is a bacterium species from the genus of Streptomyces which has been isolated from soil in the Nagano City in Japan. Streptomyces vitaminophilus produces the pyrrolomycin complex.

See also 
 List of Streptomyces species

References

Further reading

External links
Type strain of Streptomyces vitaminophilus at BacDive – the Bacterial Diversity Metadatabase

vitaminophilus
Bacteria described in 1986